The  is a manufacturer of trucks and buses. It is headquartered in Kawasaki, Kanagawa, Japan. Currently, it is 89.29% owned by Germany-based Daimler Truck.

Fuso derives from the ancient Chinese term fusang (扶桑), for a sacred tree said to grow at the spot in the east where the sun rises, and has been used to refer to Japan itself. The actual fuso tree is a hibiscus.

History

Mitsubishi Heavy Industries. 
In 1932, the first B46 bus (the Fuso) was built at the Mitsubishi Shipbuilding Company's Kobe Works. Two years later (1934), the Mitsubishi Shipbuilding Company was renamed Mitsubishi Heavy Industries (MHI). Three years after that (1937), the MHI motor-vehicle operations at the Kobe Works were transferred to the Tokyo Works.  In 1949, the Fuso Motors Sales Company was established. 

In 1950, Mitsubishi Heavy Industries was split into three companies: 

 West Japan Heavy Industries. 
 Central Japan Heavy Industries.
 East Japan Heavy Industries.

Two years later (1952):

 West Japan Heavy Industries  was renamed  Mitsubishi Shipbuilding and Engineering Company.
 Central Japan Heavy Industries  was renamed  Shin Mitsubishi Heavy Industries.
 East Japan Heavy Industries  was renamed  Mitsubishi Nippon Heavy Industries (MNHI). 
 Fuso Motor Sales Company  was renamed  the Mitsubishi Fuso Motors Sales Company.

Products from the companies were distributed by Mitsubishi Fuso Motor Sales because of brand recognition.

Mitsubishi Fuso Heavy Industries. 
In 1957, MNHI integrated the Tokyo and Kawasaki Works into the Tokyo Motor Vehicle Works.  Seven years later (1964), these three companies merged to form Mitsubishi Fuso Heavy Industries;

Distribution 
Mitsubishi Fuso Motors Sales split into two divisions: Shin and Fuso Motors Sales Company. 

Sharing a logo, they split the distribution of heavy and light machinery; Shin distributed light machinery branded as Mitsubishi, and Fuso distributed heavy machinery branded as Fuso.

Mitsubishi Motor Company 
In 1970, MFHI signed a joint-venture agreement with Chrysler Corporation, establishing the Mitsubishi Motors Corporation (MMC), and MFHI transferred its motor-vehicle operations to MMC.

In 1975, MMC opened the Nakatsu Plant at its Tokyo Motor Vehicle Works; five years later, it opened the Kitsuregawa Proving Grounds. Four years after that, MMC merged with Mitsubishi Motor Sales Company. 

In 1985, MMC and Mitsubishi Corporation established the joint-equity company Mitsubishi Trucks of America in the United States. Eight years later, MMC and Chrysler dissolved their equity partnership. The following year, MMC and Mitsubishi joined to design, build, and distribute the Mitsubishi Lancer.

In 1999, MMC and Volvo joined their truck and bus operations, and Volvo acquired 5% of MMC. Two years later, DaimlerChrysler, formed after Chrysler had merged with Mercedes-Benz owners Daimler-Benz, replaced Volvo as MMC's truck and bus partner and MMC renamed the Tokyo Plant the Truck and Bus Production Office (also known as the Kawasaki Plant).

In 2003, the Mitsubishi Fuso Truck and Bus Corporation (MFTBC) was established. DaimlerChrysler, Mitsubishi Motors Corporation, and other Mitsubishi companies acquired 43, 42. and 15% shares, respectively, in MFTBC. 

In 2005, Mitsubishi Motors Corporation transferred its MFTBC shares to DaimlerChrysler as part of their compensation agreement for financial damages resulting from quality problems and recalls at MFTBC. DaimlerChrysler and the Mitsubishi companies hold shares of 89 and 11%, respectively. In 2006, MFTBC moved its headquarters from Tokyo to Kawasaki-shi, Kanagawa; the following year, DaimlerChrysler sold its majority stake in Chrysler Corporation to Cerberus Capital Management. The corporation was renamed Daimler AG (now the Mercedes-Benz Group) and the DaimlerChrysler Truck Group was renamed Daimler Trucks; MFTBC is part of the Daimler Trucks Division of Daimler AG.

On May 27, 2020, Mitsubishi Fuso Truck of America announced it is discontinuing new truck sales. The move is a result of a re-evaluation by Mitsubishi Fuso Truck and Bus Corp. of its business situation in the United States and Canada, according to the announcement, as the company shifts to a service-focused operation in these markets.

Facilities
Fuso trucks are developed and built primarily at these Japanese facilities:
 Kitsuregawa Proving Ground
 Kawasaki Plant and Research and Development Center
 Nakatsu Plant, Aikawa, Kanagawa
 Mitsubishi Fuso Bus Manufacturing Company in Toyama, Toyama

Mitsubishi Fuso Canter work trucks are manufactured in Egypt, Tramagal (Portugal), the Philippines, Venezuela, Turkey, and Russia. They are marketed in Japan, Europe, Australia, New Zealand, Indonesia, and a number of other Asian countries, as well as in the United States.

They are also manufactured in India at the Daimler India Commercial Vehicles plant in Oragadam, near Chennai. Those vehicles are sold in East Africa and Southeast Asia. Mitsubishi Fuso's European marketing and sales headquarters is in Stuttgart.

Products

Van 
 Canter Van (OEM Nissan Caravan, export only)

Trucks 
 Canter aka FE/FF/FG/FH, formerly also rebadged and sold as the Sterling 360
 Canter Guts (Canter Mini  FA/FB/FC/FD)
 Canter Eco Hybrid
 Fighter aka FH/FK/FM/FL
 The Great
 Super Great/Heavy Duty aka FP/FS/FV
 Fuso Shogun (manufactured in New Zealand)
 Fuso FJ (manufactured in India by BharatBenz for export)
 Fuso TV (manufactured in Malaysia and Thailand)
 Fuso FI

Buses and chassis 
 Rosa
 Aero Midi MK/MJ/ME
 Aero Star MP
 Aero King
 Aero Ace/Bus/Queen MS
 Mitsubishi Cruiser
 Mitsubishi Eagle
 Fuso BK125L (Bus chassis)
 Fuso BM115/116/117/118 (Bus chassis)
 Fuso FE84G (Bus chassis)
 Fuso RK (Bus chassis)
 Fuso RM (Bus chassis)
 Fuso RP (Bus chassis)

Electric transport
The Mitsubishi Fuso Aero Star diesel-electric bus is being tested in Japan. According to the company, it can reduce fuel consumption by as much as 30%. The Aero Star uses a series hybrid drive, where its diesel engine drives an electric generator to recharge lithium-ion batteries connected to the two electric motors with a combined output of 158 kW, which propel the vehicle. Series hybrids are efficient on urban buses. Opposed to the buses the Mitsubishi Fuso Canter Eco Hybrid uses a parallel hybrid system with an electric Motor-generator on the transmission input shaft. This system maintains better efficiency gains at higher speeds.

Global distribution
Outside Japan, vehicles manufactured by the corporation are sold in:
 Latin America by Mitsubishi Motors, Daimler, and independent dealers (in Mexico, some Fuso vehicles are offered in Freightliner trademark,  to replace the Sterling Trucks image that previously badged some trucks such as Canter and Super Great)
 Asia by Mitsubishi Motors,  Mitsubishi Fuso Company, and Daimler independent dealers
 Middle East by Mitsubishi Motors and independent dealers
 Africa by Mitsubishi and independent dealers in Rwanda by Akagera Business Group
 Oceania by Daimler-Mercedes-Benz, Mitsubishi Motors, Fuso, and independent dealers
 Europe by Daimler Trucks and dealers

References

https://www.truckinginfo.com/359173/mitsubishi-fuso-truck-of-america-discontinues-new-truck-sales

External links

 

 
Vehicle manufacturing companies established in 1932
Bus manufacturers of Japan
Companies based in Kanagawa Prefecture
Daimler Truck
Electric vehicle manufacturers of Japan
Hybrid electric bus manufacturers
Japanese brands
Japanese companies established in 1932
Japanese subsidiaries of foreign companies
Mitsubishi companies
Plug-in hybrid vehicles
Truck manufacturers of Japan